The 159th Boat Race between crews from the University of Oxford and the University of Cambridge took place on 31 March 2013.  Held annually, the event is a side-by-side rowing race between crews from the Universities of Oxford and Cambridge along the River Thames.  The Cambridge crew featured the first rower from the Czech Republic to compete in the event.  Umpired by former Olympic medallist and former Oxford rower Matthew Pinsent, Oxford won by a margin of  lengths in a time of 17 minutes and 27 seconds.

In the reserve race, Oxford's Isis defeated Cambridge's Goldie, and Oxford won the Women's Boat Race.

Background
The Boat Race is a side-by-side rowing competition between the University of Oxford (sometimes referred to as the "Dark Blues") and the University of Cambridge (sometimes referred to as the "Light Blues").  First held in 1829, the race takes place on the  Championship Course on the River Thames in southwest London.  The rivalry is a major point of honour between the two universities and followed throughout the United Kingdom and broadcast worldwide. Cambridge went into the race as reigning champions, having won the disrupted 2012 race by  lengths, and led overall with 81 victories to Oxford's 76 (excluding the "dead heat" of 1877).  The race was sponsored for the second consecutive year by BNY Mellon.

Following the disruption caused by a protester in the previous year's race, Royal Marines provided support to the security arrangements surrounding the race. Race director David Searle urged nobody to repeat the disruption of 2012, saying "What I would say to anybody thinking of doing that, is that it's unbelievably dangerous ... We had practised emergency stops and it worked". The manner of any potential restart was modified to allow the race re-commence as soon as practicable. The Metropolitan Police had made contact with the protester, Trenton Oldfield, to assist him making a more peaceful protest should he wish to do so, but he declined the offer and did not attend the race in any capacity.

Oxford announced that they had named their boat Acer in honour of former cox Acer Nethercott who had died two months earlier from brain cancer. Nethercott, an Olympic silver medallist in Beijing, had coxed Oxford in the 2003, 2004 and 2005 races.

The first Women's Boat Race took place in 1927, but did not become an annual fixture until the 1960s. Up until 2014, the contest was conducted as part of the Henley Boat Races, but as of the 2015 race, it is held on the River Thames, on the same day as the men's main and reserve races.  The reserve race, contested between Oxford's Isis boat and Cambridge's Goldie boat has been held since 1965.  It usually takes place on the Tideway, prior to the main Boat Race.

Crews
For the second consecutive year, Cambridge's crew featured just one British rower. Cambridge was coached by Steve Trapmore for the third time, and declared "It's the best crew I've had in my time at Cambridge". Oxford's Sean Bowden who was coaching the university for an eighteenth time, was "very satisfied" with his crew. Milan Bruncvík was the first Czech rower in the history of the Boat Race. Three medallists from the 2012 Summer Olympics featured: Cambridge's George Nash won a bronze for Great Britain in the coxless pair, Oxford's Constantine Louloudis won bronze for Great Britain in the men's eight and his crew-mate Malcolm Howard won silver for Canada in the same event.

Race
Oxford won the toss and elected to start from the Surrey station. The weather conditions were adverse, with a "brisk wind" and snow flurries prior to the race. The race commenced at 4:31 p.m., and despite a good start from Cambridge, Oxford quickly moved to hold a half-length lead. With blades nearly overlapping, Umpire Pinsent issued warnings to both coxes to avoid a clash, and approaching Hammersmith Bridge, Oxford's lead extended to nearly a length. Cambridge kept in touch despite a push from Oxford, but by Barnes Bridge, Oxford were two lengths clear, and according to James Cracknell, they were "the fastest eight in the world right now." Oxford passed the finishing post  lengths clear, in a time of 17 minutes 27 seconds.

In the reserve race, Oxford's Isis defeated Cambridge's Goldie by one third of a length,  the smallest margin of victory ever recorded in the reserves race.  Oxford won the 68th Women's Boat Race by  lengths.

Reaction
Olympic gold medallist Katherine Grainger presented Oxford with the trophy. Winning cox Zorilla said "It was fun, tough but that was what we expected. We had a plan and we stuck to it ruthlessly." His Light Blue counterpart, Fieldman, remarked: "I asked a lot of the guys and they gave it me every time.  Unfortunately it wasn't quite enough.”

The BBC apologised for broadcasting Zorilla's repeated swearing.  A microphone in the Oxford boat picked up the "bad language" during the latter half of the race which was subsequently broadcast live on both BBC One and the BBC World News channel. Further swearing from Zorilla was broadcast as he emerged from the Thames after the customary soaking of the victorious cox.

References

External links
 Official website

The Boat Race
2013 in English sport
2013 in rowing
March 2013 sports events in the United Kingdom
2013 sports events in London